Edmund Entin (born December 10, 1985) is an American actor. He is known for his role as Robin Stanton in The Seeker: The Dark is Rising and as Jonah in the After Dark Originals film Seconds Apart.

Biography
Edmund was born in Miami, Florida, the twin brother of Gary Entin. He grew up in Pembroke Pines, Florida, where he started his acting career with the Pembroke Pines Theater of the Performing Arts. Among his prior roles was Eugene in the PPTOPA production of Neil Simon's Brighton Beach Memoirs. He also starred in productions at Main Street Players in Miami Lakes including You're A Good Man Charlie Brown and Lost in Yonkers.

Edmund and his brother Gary began their filming careers in the backyard of their "Uncle Michael." The house was located in Southwest Ranches, FL. They would write plots, pick out their cast from the neighborhood kids, and film movies. Currently, Edmund is living with his brother in California pursuing their dreams of becoming movie stars.

Entin is Jewish.

Filmography

as an Actor

as Producer

References

External links

1985 births
Living people
Male actors from Miami
Identical twins
American twins
21st-century American male actors